Mediclinic International plc, founded in 1983, is an international private hospital group with operations in South Africa, Namibia, Switzerland and the United Arab Emirates. The Group's head office is based in Stellenbosch, South Africa. It has been listed on the JSE, the South African securities exchange, since 1986. It is also listed on the London Stock Exchange and it is a constituent of the FTSE 250 Index.

History
Mediclinic International was founded in 1983 in Stellenbosch, South Africa when its current chairman, Dr Edwin Hertzog, was commissioned by the then Rembrandt Group (now Remgro Group) to undertake a feasibility study on how profitable private hospitals could be. Three years later Mediclinic International, running four hospitals in commission and three hospitals under construction, listed on the JSE, the South African stock exchange in 1986.

In 2006, Mediclinic reached agreement to acquire a controlling interest in Emirates Healthcare in Dubai, United Arab Emirates, which then owned one hospital, the rights to develop two further hospitals in the Dubai Healthcare City and five clinics.

Mediclinic acquired Hirslanden, the largest private hospital group in Switzerland, for SF2.54bn in 2007.

In June 2015, Mediclinic then acquired a 29.9% interest in Spire Healthcare, a UK-based private healthcare group.

Mediclinic announced a reverse merger of Al Noor Hospitals in October 2015. The former Mediclinic shareholders owned up to 93% of the combined business on completion. The merger was completed on 15 February 2016.

The healthcare group officially started trading on the London Stock Exchange on 16 February 2016.

The South African arm of Mediclinic was criticised in 2021 when it emerged that controversial doctor Wouter Basson was working at one of its Western Cape facilities.

Operations
Mediclinic also holds a 29.9% interest in Spire Healthcare, a LSE listed and UK-based private healthcare group.

References

External links 
 Mediclinic International Official Site

Health care companies of South Africa
Companies based in Stellenbosch
Companies listed on the Johannesburg Stock Exchange
South African companies established in 1983